An elevenie (German Elfchen – Elf "eleven" and -chen as diminutive suffix to indicate diminutive size and endearment) is a short poem with a given pattern. It contains eleven words which are arranged in a specified order over five rows. Each row has a requirement that can vary.

Structure 
The typical structure of an elevenie is as follows:

Use in education 
The elevenie is mostly taught in primary school, but also in secondary school as well as in language teaching, including German as a Second Language, and religious education. The pedagogical objective of the elevenie is to develop creativity and communication through writing poetry, and for best results it is taught in a playful, interactive way. It is also used as an alternative to brainstorming to introduce a new topic or facilitate discussion.

Examples 

The three elevenies together can be seen as a poem, with each elevenie a verse in the larger poem.

Literature 
 P. Hiebel, C. Stopfel: Elf Wörter brauchst Du nur. In: Grundschulmagazin. (3) 1998.
 I. Weigel: Motivierende Schreibanlässe im zweiten und dritten Schuljahr. In: L. Blumenstock, E. Renner (Hrsg.): Freies und angeleitetes Schreiben. 4th edition, Basel 1996.
 U. Marbot, Pfr. S. Stucki: Mit Freude schreiben – Tag für Tag. 2012. (Content: Examples of elevenies and writing guidelines)

See also 
 Cinquain
 Haiku

External links 
 eleven words - grace kerina - Description for elevenies 

Poetic forms